Birger Persson (born in 1892) was a Swedish footballer who played for FC Basel as forward.

Football career
Persson joined Basel's first team for their 1910–11 FC season. He played his first game for the club in the friendly away match in the Schützenwiese on 4 September 1910 as Basel won 2–0 against Winterthur. He scored his first goal for his club in the friendly match on 5 March 1911 in Mannheim, Germany. But it could not save the team as Basel were defeated 1–6 by Mannheimer FG 1896.

After playing in eight friendly matches, Persson played his domestic league debut for the club in the away game in the Landhof on 21 January 1912 as Basel were defeated 1–2 by local rivals Nordstern Basel.

Persson played two seasons for Basel's first team. In the 1912–13 season he played for the club's reserve team, who at that time played in the Serie C, the third tear of Swiss football.

Notes

Footnotes

1910–11 season matches: 
Aarau-FCB, FCB-YB, Stella-FCB, FCB-Biel, FCB-Aarau, YB-FCB, FCB-Stella, OB-FCB, Bern-FCB and Biel-FCB
1911–12 season matches:
FCB-Nordstern, LcdF-FCB, Sporting-FCB, Biel-FCB, FCB-Biel, YB-FCB

References

Sources
 Rotblau: Jahrbuch Saison 2017/2018. Publisher: FC Basel Marketing AG. 
 Die ersten 125 Jahre. Publisher: Josef Zindel im Friedrich Reinhardt Verlag, Basel. 
 Profile: Birger Persson at Verein "Basler Fussballarchiv"

FC Basel players
Swedish footballers
Association football forwards
Swiss Super League players
1892 births
Date of death missing